Jean-Pierre Kucheida (born 24 February 1943 in Liévin) is a member of the National Assembly of France. He represents the 12th constituency of the Pas-de-Calais département, and is a member of the Socialist Party which is affiliated to the Socialiste, radical, citoyen et divers gauche parliamentary group. He is of Polish descent.

References

1943 births
Living people
People from Liévin
French people of Polish descent
Socialist Party (France) politicians
Politicians from Hauts-de-France
Deputies of the 12th National Assembly of the French Fifth Republic
Deputies of the 13th National Assembly of the French Fifth Republic